John Jeshua Kettler (1659–1718), was a Dutch-speaking Kettler. He came to Surat, India for business. He traveled from Surat to Delhi, Agra and Lahore. He learned Hindi and wrote Hindustani grammar in Dutch. This Dutch manuscript was copied by Isaac Van Der Hoeve in 1698. It was translated into Latin by David Mill. The Latin version of this book was published in 1743 in Leiden, Holland. A copy is available in the National Library of India.

Early life

His father was a bookbinder and he wanted John to follow him.

References

1659 births
1718 deaths